Trevor Thompson may refer to:

 Trevor Thompson (footballer, born 1936), Northern Irish footballer
 Trevor Thompson (footballer, born 1955) (1955-2021), English footballer
 Trevor Thompson (basketball) (born 1994), American basketball center